Yang Zhenya (1928 – 8 September 2018) was a Chinese diplomat. He was born in Dalian, Liaoning. He was Ambassador of the People's Republic of China to Japan (1988–1993).

Yang died in Beijing on 8 September 2018, aged 90.

References

1928 births
2018 deaths
Ambassadors of China to Japan
Members of the Standing Committee of the 8th National People's Congress
Dalian University alumni
People's Republic of China politicians from Liaoning
Politicians from Dalian